The title of Archbishop of St. Andrews has existed in a number of churches in Scotland:

the Archbishop of St Andrews, senior churchman in Scotland before the Reformation (for those Bishops, with a full list, see also Bishop of St. Andrews)
the Archbishop of St Andrews, bishopric of the Episcopalian Church of Scotland at times during the 17th century, now superseded by the Bishopric of Saint Andrews, Dunkeld and Dunblane.
Archbishop of Saint Andrews and Edinburgh, refounded Roman Catholic Archdiocese - in 2006 held by Cardinal Keith O'Brien.